The Hillsdale Academy is a K-12 liberal arts school operated by Hillsdale College.  Hillsdale Academy is located in Hillsdale, Michigan.

History

The Hillsdale Academy was founded in 1990 as a model K-8 school. Originally housed in mobile units with 2 grades (clusters) assigned to each building, the school tried to emulate the one-room schoolhouse education that former Hillsdale College President George Roche III experienced as a child in Colorado. The school was originally located on Barber Drive, across from the Slayton Arboretum and adjacent to the Simpson practice fields.

A new double level building was finished in 1998. With the new building an Upper School was added, incorporating grades 9-12. The Upper School students have classrooms on the top floor, while Lower School students have their classrooms on the bottom floor. The school is located south-east of Hillsdale College, near the George Roche Sports Complex. The first headmaster of the K-12 Academy was Scot Hicks.

Athletics

Hillsdale Academy has athletics for both boys and girls with their mascot name of the "Colts."  For boys, Hillsdale offers basketball, cross country, golf, soccer, and track. For girls, they offer basketball, cross country, golf, track, and volleyball.

References

External links 

Private high schools in Michigan
Hillsdale College
Educational institutions established in 1990
Schools in Hillsdale County, Michigan
1990 establishments in Michigan
Public middle schools in Michigan
Public elementary schools in Michigan
Hillsdale, Michigan